Lynne Cantwell (born 27 September 1981) is an Irish rugby union player. 2014 Women's Rugby World Cup. She is 's most capped female player. She played at the 2013 Rugby World Cup Sevens.

In 2019, she was on the first panel to determine the World Rugby women's-15s player-of-the-year award with Melodie Robinson, Danielle Waterman, Will Greenwood, Liza Burgess, Fiona Coghlan, Gaëlle Mignot, Jillion Potter, Stephen Jones, and Karl Te Nana.

Cantwell has a Sports and Exercise Science degree from the University of Limerick and a Masters in Physiotherapy from Southampton University.  As of 2019, Cantwell is a member of the board of Sports Ireland.

References

1981 births
Alumni of the University of Limerick
Irish female rugby union players
Munster Rugby women's players
Leinster Rugby women's players
Ireland women's international rugby union players
Ireland international women's rugby sevens players
Irish Exiles women's rugby union players
Sport Ireland officials
Living people